Gibbie Abercrombie (9 May 1928 – 23 August 1992) was a Scotland international rugby union player.

Rugby Union career

Amateur career

Abercrombie played rugby union for Edinburgh University.

He then moved to play for Heriots.

Provincial career

He played for the Blues Trial side against Whites Trial in 1950.

International career

He was capped for Scotland 7 times in the period 1949-1950. He scored one try against England at Murrayfield in 1950, his last cap for Scotland.

Medical career

After he graduated from Edinburgh University as a doctor, he moved to the north shore of Auckland in New Zealand where he became a G.P.

References

1928 births
1992 deaths
Rugby union players from Auckland
Scottish rugby union players
Scotland international rugby union players
Rugby union hookers